Pauliine Koskelo (née Järvelä; born June 22, 1956) was appointed President of the Supreme Court of Finland in 2005. On 21 April 2015 she was elected as a judge to the European Court of Human Rights by the Parliamentary Assembly of the Council of Europe.

Education	
Koskelo is a graduate of the University of Helsinki Law Faculty, and Dr. iur. h.c. of that university.

Early career
Koskelo served at the Ministry of Justice in various areas of legislative work and international co-operation, including questions of European Union law. Between 1999 and 2015, she worked in senior positions at the legal directorate of the European Investment Bank (EIB) in Luxembourg, dealing with institutional and other EU law matters.

Other activities
 Network of Presidents of the Supreme Judicial Courts of the EU Member States, Vice-President 
 European Academy of Law (ERA), President of the Board of Trustees

Publications 
Avioerot ja niihin vaikuttaneet tekijät 1930–1977 (gradu, 1979)
Avoliitto vai avioliitto? (1984), together with Sami Mahkonen, 
Kauppalain pääkohdat (1987), together with Leif Sevón and Thomas Wilhelmsson, 
Uudet velkalait perinnässä (1993), together with Yrjö Lehtonen, 
Yksityishenkilön velkajärjestely (1993), together with Liisa Lehtimäki, 
Yrityssaneeraus (1994), 
Henkilökohtainen velkavastuu ja insolvenssimenettely (2004),

See also
 Academy of European Law

References

1956 births
Living people
People from Salo, Finland
20th-century Finnish lawyers
Judges of the European Court of Human Rights
Finnish judges of international courts and tribunals
21st-century Finnish judges
Finnish women lawyers